Paul Caica (born 1957) is an Australian politician, representing the South Australian Branch of the Australian Labor Party. He represented the South Australian House of Assembly seat of Colton from the 2002 election until his retirement in 2018. He served in the state ministry from 2006 to 2013 under both Mike Rann and Jay Weatherill.

Early life
Caica attended Henley Primary and High Schools before graduating from Adelaide University with a Bachelor of Arts in 1985. He was a firefighter for almost 20 years before holding the full-time position of secretary of the South Australian United Firefighters Union between 1991 and 1997 and the National Secretary of the United Firefighters Union from 1998 to 2002 where he represented firefighters on a national basis.

Parliament
Caica was elected as the member for the bellwether seat of Colton at the 2002 election. He is from the Labor Left faction.

Despite the decades-long bellwether history of Colton, the 2016 electoral redistribution saw Colton redrawn from a 1.5 percent marginal Labor seat to a notional 3.7 percent marginal Liberal seat.

Caica announced in February 2017 that he would be retiring from parliament as of the 2018 election.

Cabinet
He served in the following portfolios in Cabinet:

 Minister for Gambling (2006–2008)
 Minister for Employment, Training and Further Education (2006–2009)
 Minister for Youth (2006–2009)
 Minister for Science and Information Technology (2007–2009)
 Minister for Volunteers (2008–2009)
 Minister for Industrial Relations (2008–2010)
 Minister for Agriculture, Food and Fisheries (2009–2010)
 Minister for Forests (2009–2010)
 Minister for Regional Development (2009–2010)
 Minister for Environment and Conservation (2010–2011)
 Minister for the River Murray (2010–2011)
 Minister for Water (2010–2011)
 Minister for Aboriginal Affairs and Reconciliation (2011–2013)
 Minister for Sustainability, Environment and Conservation (2011–2013)
 Minister for Water and the River Murray (2011–2013)

Sport
At the 2007 World Police and Fire Games in Adelaide, Caica won two gold medals for Angling.

Family
Caica is married with two sons.

References

External links

Parliamentary Profile: SA Labor website
 

Members of the South Australian House of Assembly
1957 births
Living people
Australian Labor Party members of the Parliament of South Australia
Labor Left politicians
21st-century Australian politicians